Capel Mawr is a hamlet in the community of Llangristiolus, Ynys Môn, Wales, which is 130.3 miles (209.7 km) from Cardiff and 214.6 miles (345.4 km) from London. The chapel of the same name (Capel Mawr) was built in 1773.

References

See also 
 List of localities in Wales by population

Villages in Anglesey